"No Another Time" is a song recorded by Lynn Anderson, which she released in 1968 as a single and on her album Promises, Promises. It spent 14 weeks on Billboards Hot Country Singles chart, reaching No. 8, while reaching No. 7 on Record Worlds Top C&W Singles chart, No. 12 on the Cash Box Country Top 50, and No. 19 on Canada's RPM Country Chart.

Chart performance

References

1968 songs
1968 singles
Lynn Anderson songs